Koboko District is a district in the Northern Region of Uganda. The town of Koboko is the site of the district headquarters.

Location
Koboko District is bordered by South Sudan to the north, Yumbe District to the east, Maracha District to the south, and the Democratic Republic of the Congo (DRC) to the west.

Overview
Koboko District consists of two counties namely, Koboko North and Koboko South.  The Koboko North County consists of the Aringa Speaking Community Inclined to Lugbara and the South Inclined to the Pure Kakwa Speaking.

Population
In 1991, the national population census estimated the district population at 62,300. The 2002 national census estimated the population at 129,100, of whom 65,400 (50.6 percent) were female and 63,800 (49.4 percent) were male. The annual population growth rate, between 2002 and 2012, was calculated at 6.4 percent. In 2012, the population was approximately 236,900.

Landmarks
The district is the location of a tripoint, where the international borders of the DRC, South Sudan, and Uganda intersect.

See also
 Kakwa people
 West Nile sub-region

References

External links
 Koboko District Official Website

 
West Nile sub-region
Districts of Uganda
Northern Region, Uganda